The Belgian-Francophone magazine AMI (Armes-Militaria-Informations-Tir) was first published in 1979.  It published articles about firearms and militaria.

It became ArMI in 1987, then Fire in 1990. The magazine Fire, owned by the mercenaries Bob Denard and Christian Tavernier, was discontinued in 2002.

These magazines were sold at newsstands in Belgium, France and Switzerland.

See also
 List of magazines in Belgium

References

1979 establishments in Belgium
2000 disestablishments in Belgium
Magazines published in Belgium
Defunct magazines published in Belgium
French-language magazines
Magazines established in 1979
Magazines disestablished in 2000
Military magazines
Monthly magazines published in Belgium